Calendar is a 2009 Malayalam movie which contains an ensemble cast of Prithviraj Sukumaran, Navya Nair, Zarina Wahab, Mukesh, Jagathy Sreekumar and Maniyanpilla Raju.

Plot
Calendar tells the story of the strong bonding between a mother and her daughter. Thankam George, aka Thankamma, a college professor was widowed at a young age. But she didn't agree to remarriage and lived for her daughter Kochurani, now a college student. Both Thankam and Kochurani can't remain separated.

Kochurani is in love with Olikkara Sojappan, who is a constant visitor to their house. But things turn sour when Thankam learns that Sojappan and Kochurani are in love. She objects to their marriage. She can't even think of living alone, without her daughter. But ultimately relents on the condition that Sojappan won't take Kochurani away from her and will stay with her. They are engaged to be married. Cut to three years later, Thankam and Kochurani shift over to another place. And then comes Dr. Roy Chacko.

Roy's mother Annamma wants Roy to get married as soon as possible. She has been asking Manjooran, in whose hospital Roy works (and who is also related to Thankam), to find him a suitable bride. It's at this juncture that Thankam and Kochurani come there. Manjooran decides to try to get Roy married to Kochurani. The story goes on from there and reaches a climax. But fate has something else in store for them. In an accident, Sojappan dies and Kochurani gets injured. In that accident, the doctor who treated Kochurani says that to Majooran that Kochurani was 3 months pregnant. Thankamma decides to marry Kochurani to Roy Chako. After Kochurani marry Roy things get changed. Kochurani now not minding her mother, Thankamma gets depressed. Thankamma wants Kochurani near her so she decides to write a letter to Mukesh saying Kochurani was in love with a guy named Sojappan. An angry Kochurani speaks harshly to Thankamma which causes Thankamma to leave her house. Roy convinces Kochurani that her mother loves her more that's why Thankamma is very possessive of her. Now Kochurani understands her mistakes and both go to Thankamma's house. when they went to Thankamma's house they are shocked to know that Thankamma left her house sadly. Finally, they find Thankamma in her uncle's house. There Kochurani goes to her mother to ask pardon for whatever she said in angriness. At last, Kochurani finds her mother dead. And she regrets it badly.

Cast

Soundtrack

The film's soundtrack contains eight songs, all composed by Afzal Yusuf and Lyrics by Anil Panachooran.

References

External links 
 

2009 films
2000s Malayalam-language films
2000s romantic thriller films
Indian romantic thriller films
Films scored by Afzal Yusuf